Roger-Jean Le Nizerhy (3 December 1916 – 28 January 1999) was a French cyclist who won a gold medal in the team pursuit at the 1936 Summer Olympics. In 1939 he turned professional and rode the 1949 Tour de France. He retired in 1952.

References

1916 births
1999 deaths
Cyclists at the 1936 Summer Olympics
Olympic cyclists of France
Olympic gold medalists for France
French male cyclists
Olympic medalists in cycling
Cyclists from Paris
Medalists at the 1936 Summer Olympics
French track cyclists